The 76th Oregon Legislative Assembly convened beginning on , for the first of its two regular sessions. All 60 seats of the House of Representatives and 16 of the 30 state senate seats were up for election in 2010. The general election for those seats took place on November 2. The Democrats retained the majority in the senate, but lost six seats in the house, leading to an even split (30-30) between Democrats and Republicans. The governor of Oregon during the session was John Kitzhaber, a Democrat, who was elected to a third term in 2010 following an eight-year absence from public office.

The even split in the House of Representatives was addressed with the selection of two co-speakers, Democrat Arnie Roblan and Republican Bruce Hanna. The two were selected by Governing Magazine among its eight "Public Officials of the Year," and praised for "setting in motion a tenure that has been marked by rare bipartisan cooperation and two of the most productive legislative sessions in Oregon's history."

The 76th was the first session in which the legislature met twice in regular session, following the 2010 passage of Ballot Measure 71, which instituted a second regular session for each two-year legislative term.

Senate members 

The Oregon State Senate is composed of 16 Democrats and 14 Republicans. In the last election, the Democratic Party lost two seats: in District 20, Martha Schrader lost a close election to Alan Olsen and in District 26, Rick Metsger did not seek re-election and was replaced by Chuck Thomsen.

Senate President: Peter Courtney (D–11 Salem)
President Pro Tem: Ginny Burdick (D–18 Portland)
Majority Leader: Diane Rosenbaum (D–21 Portland)
Minority Leader: Ted Ferrioli (R–30 John Day)

House members 

The Oregon House of Representatives is split evenly between 30 Democrats and 30 Republicans and the parties share control of the chamber. Republicans gained six seats over the previous session.

Co-Speaker: Bruce Hanna (R–7 Roseburg)
Co-Speaker: Arnie Roblan (D–9 Coos Bay)
Co-Speaker Pro Tempore: Tina Kotek (D–44 Portland)
Co-Speaker Pro Tempore: Andy Olson (R–15 Albany)
Republican Leader Representative: Kevin Cameron (R–19 Salem)
Democratic Leader Representative: Dave Hunt (D–40 Gladstone) (Jan. 11, 2011 – June 30, 2011), Tina Kotek (D–44 Portland) (June 30, 2011–end of legislative assembly)

References

External links 
 Chronology of regular legislative sessions from Oregon Blue Book
 Chronology of special legislative sessions from Blue Book
 Official overview of bill considered during the 2011 regular session
 Official overview of bill considered during the 2012 regular session

Oregon legislative sessions
2011 in Oregon
2012 in Oregon
2011 U.S. legislative sessions
2012 U.S. legislative sessions